Vasiliki is a Greek female given name. The male version of this name is Vasilios.

Notable people with the name include: 
Vasiliki Alexandri (born 1997), Austrian synchronized swimmer
Vasiliki Anastasiadou (born 1958), Cypriot politician, government minister
Vasiliki Angelopoulou (born 1987), Greek swimmer
Vasiliki Arvaniti (born 1985), Greek beach volleyball player
Vasiliki Diamantopoulou (born 1979), Greek water polo player
Vasiliki Kalogera, Greek astrophysicist
Vasiliki Karagiorgos (born 1983), Australian singer, songwriter and record producer known professionally as Vassy
Vaso Karantasiou (born 1973), Greek beach volleyball player
Vasiliki Kasapi (born 1983), Greek weightlifter
Vasiliki Katrivanou (born 1969), Greek psychologist and politician
Vicky Leandros (1949), Greek singer living in Germany (born Vasiliki Papathanasiou)
Vasiliki Papazoglou (born 1979), Greek volleyball player
Vasiliki Plevritou (born 1998), Greek water polo player
Vasiliki Maniou (born 1992), Greek group rhythmic gymnast
Vasiliki Millousi (born 1984), Greek artistic gymnast
Vicky Moscholiou (1943–2005), Greek singer (born Vasiliki Moscholiou)
Vasiliki Moskofidou, Greek footballer
Vasiliki Nikouli (born 1984), Greek volleyball player
Vicky Price (born Vasiliki Kourmouzi, 1952), Greek-born British economist and civil servant
Vasiliki Skara (born 1973), Greek handball player
Vasiliki Soupiadou, Greek footballer for the national team
Vasiliki Thanou-Christophilou (born 1950), Greek judge, caretaker Prime Minister of Greece in 2015
Vasiliki Tsavdaridou (born 1980), Greek artistic gymnast
Vasiliki Tsirogianni (born 1992), Greek beauty pageant winner
Vasiliki Vougiouka (born 1986), Greek sabre fencer
Vassy Kapelos (1981), Canadian political journalist

Fictional characters:
Vasiliki, title character in 1997 Greek film Vasiliki

Greek feminine given names